K14RK-D, virtual channel 14 (UHF digital channel 14), is a low-powered television station licensed to Phoenix, Arizona, United States. The station is owned by Good News Broadcasting Network, Inc. Its transmitter is located on South Mountain.

History
The station began with an original construction permit for K69FM (channel 69), granted to Broadcasting Systems of Phoenix on August 19, 1988. The station was licensed on January 11, 1990, with city of license of South Phoenix. Early programming is unknown. In February 1991, the station was sold to Polar Broadcasting of Arizona, a San Francisco, California-based company, who shortly thereafter applied to move the station to channel 67 and change the city of license to Phoenix. The station licensed its new facilities and its callsign was changed to K67FE in December 1992.

In June 1996, Polar Broadcasting sold the station to Paxson Communications (now Ion Media Networks and the station became part of Infomall TV Network, or inTV. Paxson Communications sold the station in August 1999 to Spanish Independent Broadcasting Network, who changed the programming to Spanish independent, rebroadcasting KWHY-TV (channel 22) of Los Angeles, California. The next year, needing to vacate the upper-700 MHz band (channels 60 - 69), the station applied for and was granted a permit to move to channel 53. The station was licensed in June 2002 as K53GF. Since then, the station has dropped the KWHY-TV rebroadcast and operates as an independent station, airing mostly movies and infomercials for local car dealers.

In May 2005, K53GF received a request to vacate channel 53 from Aloha Partners, who were winners of the FCC auction for the spectrum now occupied by channel 54. However, with the DTV conversion still in process, there were no suitable in-core channels to which K53GF could move their analog operations. Instead, they requested to operate as a low-power digital TV station (LPDTV) on channel 38 and the FCC granted a construction permit in October 2005 to build LPDTV station K38IZ-D. In the meantime, Aloha Partners has not launched its proposed service to Public Safety, and K53GF remained on the air on analog channel 53 until May 2010. Aloha Partners and its channel 54/59 spectrum were acquired on February 4, 2008, by AT&T Mobility.

On October 27, 2008, the station filed for special temporary authorization (STA) to continue broadcasting the analog signal until 2009. The station began digital operation under program test authority on October 30, 2008.

Digital channels
The station's signal is multiplexed:

Programming
K38IZ-D airs a mix of locally produced shows, public domain movies and paid programming in Spanish. On 38.2 the station broadcasts the Tuff TV network under the brand IZ Tuff, on 38.3 the station broadcasts classic 1970s/1980s music videos under the brand IZ Videos and on 38.4 the station broadcasts ZUUS Country under the brand IZ ZCTN. In April 2015, the station added This TV programming on channel 38.5, and became the sole affiliate when independent station KTVK (channel 3) dropped This TV on April 13. This TV was dropped on June 1, 2017, in favor of The Action Channel.

From February 2, 2009 – January 21, 2012, the station broadcast public domain movies in English on 38.2 under the brand IZ Classics, and on 38.4 the station broadcast religious programming and music videos under the brand IZ Hope.

References

External links
 
 

38IZ-D
Low-power television stations in the United States
Retro TV affiliates
Rev'n affiliates